Bertus is a given name and surname. Notable persons with that name include:

Persons with the given name
 Bertus Aafjes (1914–1993), Dutch poet 
 Bertus Borgers (born 1947), Dutch musician
 Bertus Brouwer (1881–1966), Dutch mathematician and philosopher
 Bertus Caldenhove (1914–1983), Dutch association football player
 Bertus de Harder (1920–1982), Dutch association football player 
 Bertus Erasmus (born 1977), Zimbabwean cricketer
 Bertus O'Callaghan (born 1988), Namibian rugby union player
 Bertus Basson South African chef and restaurateur
 Bertus Nuganab Namibian profiler and lawyer by profession

Persons with the surname
 Paul Bertus, American politician
 Lajos Bertus (born 1990), Hungarian association football player

See also
 Bert (name)
 Albertus (given name)
 Lambertus
 Hubertus (disambiguation)

Dutch masculine given names